The Samsung Galaxy F series is a line of midrange smartphones manufactured by Samsung Electronics as part of their Galaxy line. The first model released in the series was the Samsung Galaxy F41, which was launched on October 8, 2020. The line is sold exclusively in India, Bangladesh and China. In India, the series consists of rebranded Galaxy M models sold exclusively for the Indian market through Flipkart.

Phones

2020 

Galaxy F41

6.4" sAMOLED
Android 10, One UI 2
Exynos 9611
64 GB, 128 GB ROM / 6 GB RAM
64 MP, 8 MP ultrawide, 5 MP depth sensor, 32 MP selfie
6000 mAh battery

2021

2022

2023

See also 
 Samsung Galaxy M series
 Samsung Galaxy A series
 Samsung Galaxy Alpha (2014), reportedly originally planned to be titled "Galaxy F"
 Samsung Galaxy

References 

Samsung mobile phones
Samsung Galaxy
Android (operating system) devices
Samsung mobile series